Carvao may refer to:

 Wajxaklajun, the ruins of a Maya civilization in Guatemala
 Carvão, a village in Amapá, Brazil